Kimball is a city in Brule County, South Dakota, United States. The population was 572 at the 2020 census.

History
Kimball was first known as Stake 48 on the Chicago, Milwaukee and St. Paul Railroad line going west out of Mitchell. In 1880, the first homestead claims were made in the vicinity of Stake 48. Kimball was organized as a village in the spring of 1883. The town was named for J. W. Kimball, a railroad surveyor.

The 1895 Holy Trinity Church is on the National Register of Historic Places.

Geography
Kimball is located at  (43.747136, -98.957491). Kimball lies just north of Interstate 90 at exit 284, the southern terminus of South Dakota Highway 45.

Kimball's ZIP code is 57355 and FIPS place code is 33980.

Demographics

2010 census
At the 2010 census there were 703 people in 310 households, including 189 families, in the city. The racial makeup of the city was 95.0% White, 0.3% African American, 3.3% Native American, 0.3% Asian, 0.4% from other races, and 0.7% from two or more races. Hispanic or Latino of any race were 1.1%.

Of the 310 households 29.4% had children under the age of 18 living with them, 46.5% were married couples living together, 8.7% had a female householder with no husband present, 5.8% had a male householder with no wife present, and 39.0% were non-families. 35.2% of households were one person and 21.6% were one person aged 65 or older. The average household size was 2.26 and the average family size was 2.93.

The median age was 43 years. 26.6% of residents were under the age of 18; 5.4% were between the ages of 18 and 24; 21.7% were from 25 to 44; 27.2% were from 45 to 64; and 19.2% were 65 or older. The gender makeup of the city was 48.2% male and 51.8% female.

2000 census
At the 2000 census there were 745 people in 314 households, including 194 families, in the city. The population density was 240.7 people per square mile (92.8/km). There were 351 housing units at an average density of 113.4 per square mile (43.7/km).  The racial makeup of the city was 99.33% White, 0.54% Native American, and 0.13% from two or more races.

Of the 314 households 29.9% had children under the age of 18 living with them, 52.2% were married couples living together, 6.4% had a female householder with no husband present, and 37.9% were non-families. 35.4% of households were one person and 19.7% were one person aged 65 or older. The average household size was 2.37 and the average family size was 3.11.

The age distribution was 27.9% under the age of 18, 6.4% from 18 to 24, 24.8% from 25 to 44, 17.9% from 45 to 64, and 23.0% 65 or older. The median age was 40 years. For every 100 females, there were 88.1 males. For every 100 females age 18 and over, there were 86.5 males.

As of 2000 the median income for a household in the city was $32,167, and the median family income  was $37,813. Males had a median income of $27,727 versus $16,544 for females. The per capita income for the city was $15,398. About 5.9% of families and 10.9% of the population were below the poverty line, including 11.8% of those under age 18 and 16.7% of those age 65 or over.

Notable person
Alton Ochsner - Dr. Ochsner was born in Kimball and graduated from Kimball High School. He was "a world renowned surgeon and founder of the Ochsner Clinic and Hospital in New Orleans. Dr. Ochsner is credited with convincing the medical world of the connection between cigarette smoking and lung cancer and heart disease. A cartoonist  used his crusade as a subject for one of his drawings."

See also
 List of cities in South Dakota

References

External links

 Kimball Chamber of Commerce
 Kimball Information and Marketplace

Cities in Brule County, South Dakota
Cities in South Dakota
Populated places established in 1883
1883 establishments in Dakota Territory